Shooting at the 2011 Southeast Asian Games was held at Jakabaring Shooting Range, Palembang, Indonesia.

Medal summary

Men

Women

Medal table

Shoot
Southeast Asian Games
2011
Shooting competitions in Indonesia